Harman may refer to:

People 
 Harman (surname)

Places 
 Harman, Australian Capital Territory
 Hărman, Romania
 Harman, West Virginia
 Harmans, Maryland
 Harman, Virginia
 Harman's Cross, Dorset, England

Other uses 
 Harman International, an electronics audio manufacturer owned by Samsung Electronics
 Harmane or harman, 1-methyl-9H-pyrido[3,4-b]indole, one of the harmala alkaloids, a reversible inhibitor of MAO-A (RIMA)
 USS Harman (PF-79), a United States Navy patrol frigate which served in the Royal Navy as

See also 
 Harmon (disambiguation)